The 2014–15 season is Reading Football Club's second season in the Championship following the side's relegation from the Premier League at the end of the 2012–13 season. The season began with Nigel Adkins as manager; he was replaced by Steve Clarke in December.

Season review

Pre-season 
On 6 May, Reading announced that five players would be leaving upon the expiry of their contracts. Those departing were Stuart Taylor, Kaspars Gorkšs, Wayne Bridge, Mikele Leigertwood and club captain Jobi McAnuff. Youngsters Lawson D'Ath, Nick Arnold, Gozie Ugwu, Matt Partridge and Shepherd Murombedzi were also released whilst contract talks were taking place with Michael Hector, Jake Taylor and 18 other youth players. On 30 May youngsters Michael Hector and Jake Taylor signed new two-year contracts with the option of a third.

On 2 June, Sir John Madejski announced that the club was looking for new ownership and that Anton Zingarevich, Christopher Samuelson and Andrew Obolensky had left the board of Directors.

Transfers 

Readings first addition of the season was the signing of USA U-18 international Andrija Novakovich to their academy from USM. On 7 August 2014, Simon Cox resigned for Reading, 6 years after he left the club, on a two-year contract from Nottingham Forest. The following day Jamie Mackie signed on a season-long loan deal, also from Nottingham Forest. On 11 August 2014, Reading confirmed the signing of Anton Ferdinand on a two-year contract. Reading made their fourth permanent signing of the season on 21 August, signing Oliver Norwood to a three-year contract from Huddersfield Town. On 1 September 2014, transfer deadline day, Reading signed Glenn Murray on loan from Crystal Palace until 1 January, with a view to a permanent move.

On 28 May 2014 Adam Le Fondre moved to Cardiff City for an undisclosed fee, with Daniel Carriço following Le Fondre out of the club on 23 June 2014 after making his move to Sevilla permanent. On 7 August 2014, Reading's three young goalkeepers left on loan, Stuart Moore joined Basingstoke Town on a season long loan with Jonathan Henly also joining Basingstoke as cover for Moore, whilst George Legg joined Hendon on a months loan. On 15 August, Sean Morrison followed le Fondre to Cardiff City. On 29 August 2014, Alex McCarthy completed his move to QPR. On transfer deadline day, Royston Drenthe joined Sheffield Wednesday on loan until 2 January 2015.

August 
Reading started their season on 9 August with a 2–2 away draw at Wigan Athletic, with Shaun Cummings and Sean Morrison getting Reading's goals after Callum McManaman opened the scoring for Wigan and James McArthur scored a 93rd-minute equaliser. Three days later, on 12 August, Reading faced Newport County in the League Cup at home. Reading ran out 3–1 winners, with their goals coming from Pavel Pogrebnyak, Nick Blackman and debutante Craig Tanner. Reading won their next game, on 16 August, against Ipswich Town thanks to a Jake Taylor goal, before losing their next two games, 2–1 at home to Huddersfield Town and 4–0 away to Nottingham Forest. Reading finished August with back to back wins, 1–0 away to Scunthorpe United in the Second round of the League Cup, Jake Taylor scoring, and 1–0 away to Middlesbrough with Simon Cox scoring.

September 
On 11 September, Legg extended his loan with Hendon for another month, whilst on 12 September, Jonathan Henly moved to Welling United on loan until 1 January 2015.
The following day, 13 September, Reading faced Fulham at home, winning 3–0 thanks to a brace from Glenn Murray and the third from Nick Blackman. Reading won their fourth game in a row on 16 September, 3–2 at home to Millwall, with a double strike from Simon Cox and another from Nick Blackman. 20 September saw Reading travel to Hillsborough to face Sheffield Wednesday, with the game ending in disappointment for Reading as they fell to a 1–0 defeat courtesy of a late Stevie May goal. 
On 22 September, Reading announced the completion of the sale of the club to a Thai consortium, with Sir John Madejski staying on as Co-Chairman. The following day, 23 September, Reading suffered their second defeat in four days, as they went out of the League Cup with a 2–0 defeat to Derby County. Reading ended September with a 3–3 home draw against Wolverhampton Wanderers, with the Reading goals coming from Michael Hector, Jake Taylor and Glenn Murray, whilst Nick Blackman was unfortunate to score an own goal.

October 
Reading started October with a 0–0 draw away to Leeds United on 1 October, following it up three days later with a 3–1 away defeat to Brentford in which Simon Cox scored the only goal for Reading.
On 3 October, Garath McCleary signed a new contract with the club until the summer of 2017.
Following the International break, Reading suffered their second and third defeats in a row, both 3–0, at home to Derby County on 18 October and away to Bournemouth on 21 October.
Reading finished October with their first win in seven games, a 3–0 home win over Blackpool, with Glenn Murray and Nick Blackman scoring either side of a Peter Clarke own goal.

November
Reading started November with a 3–1 away defeat to Blackburn Rovers on 1 November, Glenn Murray scoring their only goal, before following it up three days later with a 3–0 victory over Rotherham United thanks to Jamie Mackie and a Simon Cox double.
On 8 November Reading suffered a 1–0 home defeat to Charlton Athletic, before a 2–1 away defeat to Cardiff City on 21 November. Michael Hector scored Readings only goal late on, whilst Alex Pearce had a nightmare evening, conceding an own goal before being shown a straight red card on the stroke of half-time. Reading ended the month with a 2–1 away win over Norwich City, Gary Hooper put Norwich ahead after 10 minutes before Jake Cooper scored his first ever goal for Reading in the 14th minute and his second in the 44th to give Reading all three points.

Also during November, Slovenian defender Jure Travner joined the club on trial from Azerbaijan Premier League side FK Baku.

December

Reading started the month with a 0–0 home draw against Bolton Wanderers on 6 December, before a 6–1 away defeat to Birmingham City on 13 December. Following the club's 6–1 defeat to Birmingham City, manager Nigel Adkins was sacked by the club on 15 December. The following day Reading appointed Steve Clarke on a -year contract.

Reading lost their first game with Steve Clarke as manager, a 1–0 home defeat to 10-man Watford on 20 December. They followed this defeat up with a 2–2 away draw to Manager-less Brighton & Hove Albion on 26 December, Glenn Murray scoring both the goals, before a 2–1 home win over Norwich City on 28 December thanks to Simon Cox and a Hal Robson-Kanu penalty.

Murray returned to Crystal Palace on 31 December following the completion of his loan deal.

January
On 2 January 2015, Aaron Tshibola moved to Hartlepool United on a one-month loan deal, whilst Jonathan Henly returned from his loan at Welling United and Royston Drenthe returned to the club following his loan to Sheffield Wednesday to discuss his future. The following day, Nick Blackman scored Reading's only goal in their 1–0 away win over Huddersfield Town in the Third Round of the FA Cup, setting up a Fourth Round trip to Cardiff City.
On 10 January Reading drew 0–0 at home to Middlesbrough, in a game that saw Jem Karacan make his return from a long term knee-injury, coming on as an 86th-minute substitute for Jamie Mackie. Defender Shaun Cummings left the club on 12 January, moving to Millwall two days later for an undisclosed fee. Reading lost their next game, a 2–1 away defeat to Fulham on 17 January, with Pavel Pogrebnyak scoring Reading's only goal. The following week Polish International goalkeeper, Jakub Słowik, joined the club on a week-long trial. On 22 January, Reading signed Jure Travner on a contract with the club till the end of the season, and Nathaniel Chalobah on loan till the end of the season from Chelsea, whilst youngster Craig Tanner signed a new contract till the summer of 2017 and joined AFC Wimbledon on a season-long youth loan. The next day Royston Drenthe left club, signing for Kayseri Erciyesspor of the Turkish Süper Lig on a permanent basis.
24 January saw Reading take on Cardiff City in the Fourth Round of the FA Cup, with Reading winning the games 2–1 at the Cardiff City Stadium. Cardiff took the lead through Kenwyne Jones in the first half before Oliver Norwood and Hal Robson-Kanu in the second half to send Reading into the Fifth Round.

On 27 January, Reading traveled to Millwall, playing out a 0–0 draw that saw them remain in 18th position. Two days later, 29 January, Dominic Samuel joined Coventry City on an emergency loan, which will see him stay at the club until 28 April, and midfielder Aaron Tshibola extended his stay at Hartlepool United till the end of the season. Reading's last game of January was a 2–0 victory over Sheffield Wednesday, with the goals coming from Pavel Pogrebnyak and Nathaniel Chalobah.

Young Georgian defender Lasha Dvali returned to the club in January following a year-long loan deal with Latvian Higher League side Skonto FC.

February
On transfer deadline day, 2 February, Reading signed Yakubu on a contract until the end of the season, whilst Georgian defender Lasha Dvali joined Turkish Süper Lig side Kasımpaşa on loan till the end of the season. Youngster Dominic Hyam left the club on a one-month youth loan deal on 4 February, joining Hemel Hempstead Town. On 7 February Reading traveled to Wolverhampton Wanderers, winning 2–1 after goals from Pavel Pogrebnyak and Danny Williams. Three days later, Reading hosted Leeds United in a game that the visitors won 2–0. On 14 February Reading defeated Derby County 2–1 in the Fifth Round of the FA Cup, before losing 0–1 at home to Wigan Athletic three days later. On 21 February Reading registered another away win, winning 1–0 away to Ipswich Town thanks to a 14th-minute goal by Jamie Mackie, before falling to defeat against Huddersfield Town 3–0 three days later.

March
On 3 March Reading drew 1–1 away to Bolton, with Jamie Mackie scoring the equaliser in the third and final minute of stoppage time. On 7 March Reading played their FA Cup quarter final match against League One team Bradford City, drawing 0–0 at Valley Parade. The draw resulted in a home replay, scheduled for 16 March. On 10 March  Reading hosted Brighton & Hove Albion in a 2–1 victory with both goals being scored by Jamie Mackie. Defender Niall Keown made his debut during the game, coming on as a late substitute for Danny Williams, the winning goal coming minutes after Chris O'Grady scored a penalty for the away team. On 12 March, Zat Knight signed a short-term contract until the end of the season. Reading lost their next Championship game 4–1, away to Watford on 14 March, before defeating Bradford City 3–0 in their FA Cup Quarter Final Replay to set up a Semi Final against Arsenal.
On 18 March youngster George McLennan joined Hayes & Yeading United on loan till the end of the season.
On 24 March young goalkeeper Dan Lincoln joined Nuneaton Town on a seven-day loan deal, with Nathan Aké joining Reading on an initial one-month loan a day later, before Kwesi Appiah joined on loan until the end of the season and Jake Taylor and Danny Guthrie left the club on loan till the end of the season, to Leyton Orient and Fulham respectively on 26 March. On 27 March, Reading exercised an option in Chris Gunter's contract to keep the player for another year.

On 30 March, Reading where fined £30,000 by The Football League for breaching the Football League regulations that prohibit any individual or legal entity having an interest in more than one club, when they borrowed an initial £10.5m from Vibrac Corporation in August 2013, and a further £5.6m in May 2014.

April
Reading started April with a 1–1 home draw against Cardiff City on 4 April, Pavel Pogrebnyak gave Reading an early lead, before Conor McAleny scored a 90th-minute equaliser. Reading drew their second game in a row on 7 April, away to Blackpool. Jamie O'Hara gave Blackpool an early lead from the penalty spot, after a Zat Knight shirt pull, with a Grant Hall own goal just after half-time leveling the teams. On 11 April Reading played Blackburn Rovers in a one-off kit design, designed by a young fan Ryan Duval. The game ended 0–0, the third Reading draw in a row, and also marked the first start for Jem Karacan in over a year and a half. Reading suffered their first defeat of the month on 14 April, 1–0 at home to Bournemouth. Reading's away game with Rotherham United on 18 April was postponed until 28 April, due to Reading's FA Cup Semi-Final tie with Arsenal. Alexis Sánchez gave Arsenal the lead shortly before halftime, with Garath McCleary equalising in the 54th minute to level the game and take the match to extra-time. Sánchez scored his second of the game, and the winner, on the stroke of half-time in extra time, after his weak shot was spilled over the line by Adam Federici. Reading's next game was at home to Birmingham City on 22 April, which Reading lost 1–0 to a late Clayton Donaldson goal. This was also Nathan Aké's last game for Reading as he returned to Chelsea following the game. On 25 April, Reading hosted Brentford in their last home game of the season. Reading went down 2–0 after goals from Alan Judge and James Tarkowski. After the game Adam Federici was named the clubs Player of the Season. Reading's last game of April was their rearranged game away to Rotherham United on 28 April. Reading lost the match, their fifth in a row, 2–1 with Matt Derbyshire and Lee Frecklington scoring a quick-fire double in the second half before a late Oliver Norwood goal gave Reading their consolation goal.

May
Reading won their final game of the season, and first since 10 March, on 2 May away to Derby County 3–0. Kwesi Appiah opened the scoring in the second minute, his first for the club, before Michael Hector scored the second midway through the second half and a late Garath McCleary penalty sealed the victory.

On 21 May Reading released senior players Zat Knight, Jure Travner, Danny Guthrie, Ryan Edwards and Yakubu. Whilst youth players Daniel Lincoln, Jonathan Henly, Aleksandar Gogic, and George McLennan also left the club.

Transfers

In

 Novakovich's transfer was announced on the above date but were not finalised until 1 July.

Loans in

Out

Loans out

Released

Trial

Squad

Left club during season

Pre-season

Competitions

Championship

League table

Results summary

Results by matchday

Matches

League Cup

FA Cup

Squad statistics

Appearances and goals

|-
|colspan="14"|Players away from the club on loan:

|-
|colspan="14"|Players who appeared for Reading but left during the season:

|}

Goal scorers

Clean sheets

Disciplinary record

Awards

Player of the Year

Notes

References 

Reading F.C. seasons
Reading